Olivier Giroud is a French professional footballer who has been representing the France national football team as a forward since his debut in 2011. Since then, Giroud has scored 53 goals in 120 international appearances, making him the country's all-time top scorer. He surpassed Thierry Henry's record of 51 goals with a goal against Poland in the round of 16 of the 2022 FIFA World Cup on 4 December 2022. Giroud made his debut for France in a 1−0 home win over the United States on 11 November 2011, and scored his first international goal on 29 February 2012 in his third appearance, against Germany.

Giroud's only international hat-trick came in a friendly against Paraguay on 2 June 2017, and he has netted twice in a match on ten occasions. Out of all his opponents, he has scored the most against Australia and Iceland, netting four goals against each team. Giroud has scored five goals in the FIFA World Cup, three in the UEFA European Championship, five in the UEFA Nations League, six in FIFA World Cup qualification and six in UEFA European Championship qualification. The remainder of his goals, 28, have come in friendlies. His most productive calendar year in terms of international goals was 2017, when he scored eight goals in five games for France. He also scored eight goals in 2016, but took six games to do so. With France, Giroud won the 2018 FIFA World Cup, and also reached the 2022 FIFA World Cup final and UEFA Euro 2016 final during his international career.

A prolific scorer, he has been described as a "target man" and as a "super sub", due to his playing style and penchant for scoring goals after coming off the bench. Giroud is often praised for his overall play and combination with teammates, often described as a "complete striker". When discussing Giroud's scoring capacity, France manager Didier Deschamps explained in 2022, "He's a striker who is so useful for the team even if he doesn't score himself, and there have been periods when he hasn't found the net. But, even then, he helps others to score."

Goals
 As of match played 18 December 2022. 
 Scores and results list France's goal tally first, score column indicates score after each Giroud goal

Statistics

See also
 List of leading goalscorers for the France national football team
 List of top international men's football goal scorers by country
 List of men's footballers with 50 or more international goals
 List of footballers with 100 or more caps
 List of international goals scored by Thierry Henry

References

External links
 

France national football team records and statistics
Lists of association football international goals by player